Mecardonia (axilflower) is a genus of herbaceous plants in the family Plantaginaceae. 31 species have been described,
of which 12 are accepted. Its distribution is predominantly in South America, and South East United States, including Florida

and Alabama

but may be found as far north as Virginia. 
(see map)
Five species are found in Argentina and three in the US.

Description
They are herbaceous procumbent glabrous plants. They are mostly blackened when they are dry. Their stems are 5–40 cm in length and they have 4-alate leaves. Ovate leaves 7–25 mm in length and 3–16 mm wide, with a crenate edge; petiolate. Solitary axillary flowers, pedicles 8-20 (-26) mm in length, basally bibracteolate; 5-lobed calyx, with unequal lobes, more or less free to the base, imbricate, the adaxial lobe widely lanceate to ovate, 5-9.5 mm long and 3–6 mm wide, slightly accrescent, the 2 middle lobes longer and overlapping, the 2 abaxial lobes nearly the same size as the adaxial and overlapping the middle lobes; 5-lobed corolla, 7–8 mm long, yellow with purple at the throat, bearded at the mouth; 4 fertile stamens. Ovoid fruit capsule, 5–7 mm long, loculicidal; ovoid, reticulated seeds.

Taxonomy
The genus was described by Ruiz & Pav., published in Florae Peruvianae, et Chilensis Prodromus 95.  1794.  
 
The type species is: Mecardonia procumbens Ruiz & Pav. The genus is named after Antonio Meca y Cardona, who founded the botanical gardens in Barcelona, in 1784.

Rossow (1987) in his taxonomic revision of the genus, recognized ten species. A new species, M kamogawae, was identified in Argentina by Greppi and Hagiwara (2011).

Cultivation
Sold as an ornamental garden flower, such as Mecardonia Magic Carpet Yellow, as annuals in colder areas.

Species
 Mecardonia acuminata (Walter) Small.
 Mecardonia acuminata acuminata
 Mecardonia acuminata peninsularis
 Mecardonia acuminata microphylla.
 Mecardonia berroi Marchesi	
 Mecardonia caespitosa (Cham.) Pennell	
 Mecardonia exilis (Brandegee) Pennell	
 Mecardonia flagellaris (Cham. & Schltdl.) Rossow	
 Mecardonia grandiflora (Benth.) Pennell	
 Mecardonia herniarioides (Cham.) Pennell	
 Mecardonia procumbens (Mill.) Small	
 Mecardonia pubescens Rossow	
 Mecardonia serpylloides (Cham. & Schltdl.) Pennell
 Mecardonia tenella (Cham. & Schltdl.) Pennell

References

Sources
 Rossow, R. A. 1987. Revisión del género Mecardonia (Scrophulariaceae). Candollea 42: 431-474.
 Cappellari, S. C., Harter-Marques, B., Aumeier, P. and Engels, W. (2009), Mecardonia tenella (Plantaginaceae) Attracts Oil-, Perfume-, and Pollen-Gathering Bees in Southern Brazil. Biotropica, 41: 721–729. doi: 10.1111/j.1744-7429.2009.00529.x
  Krishne Gowda, M Magaraj. Embryological studies in Mecardonia procumbens (Miller) small. Proceedings: Plant Sciences February 1983, Volume 92, Issue 1, pp 5-18
 Kaul, M. L. H. Cytogenetical Studies on Ecological Races of Mecardonia dianthera (SW) Pennell. Cytologia 34.2 (1969): 178-187.
 Julián A. Greppi, Juan C. Hagiwara. UNA NUEVA ESPECIE DE MECARDONIA (PLANTAGINACEAE). Darwiniana Vol 49, No 1 (2011) p. 43 
 Barringer, K. & W. Burger. 2000. Family 193. Scrophulariaceae. In: W. Burger (ed.), Flora Costaricensis. Fieldiana: Botany, n.s. 41: 1–69.
 Nelson, C. H. 2008. Cat. Pl. Vasc. Honduras 1–1576.
 Stevens, W. D., C. Ulloa Ulloa, A. Pool & O. M. Montiel Jarquin. 2001. Flora de Nicaragua. Monogr. Syst. Bot. Missouri Bot. Gard. 85: i–xlii,.
 Tropicos: Mecardonia

External links

 Galapagos Species Checklist: Mecardonia procumbens
 PPP-Index Search for Mecardonia.

Plantaginaceae genera
Plantaginaceae
Flora of Chile
Flora of Brazil
Flora of Argentina
Flora of the Galápagos Islands
Flora of Florida
Flora of Alabama
Flora of Virginia